The 1983 Georgia Tech Yellow Jackets football team represented the Georgia Institute of Technology during the 1983 NCAA Division I-A football season. The Yellow Jackets were led by fourth-year head coach Bill Curry, and played their home games at Grant Field in Atlanta. In their first year as full members of the Atlantic Coast Conference, the team finished in third with a final record of 3–8 (3–2 ACC).

Schedule

A.Clemson was under NCAA probation, and was ineligible for the ACC title. Therefore this game did not count in the league standings.

References

Georgia Tech
Georgia Tech Yellow Jackets football seasons
Georgia Tech Yellow Jackets football